is a passenger railway station  located in the city of Odawara, Kanagawa Prefecture, Japan, operated by the Izuhakone Railway.

Lines
Gohyakurakan Station is served by the  Daiyūzan Line, and is located 2.3 kilometers from the line’s terminus at Odawara Station.

Station layout
The station consists of a single island platform connected to a four-story concrete station building. The upper three stories of the station building are apartments. The station has a staffed service window.

Platforms

Adjacent stations

History
Gohyakurakan Station was opened on November 24, 1923, with the official opening of the Izuhakone Railway's Daiyūzan Line. The current station building was erected in August 1989.

Passenger statistics
In fiscal 2019, the station was used by an average of 713 passengers daily (boarding passengers only).

The passenger figures (boarding passengers only) for previous years are as shown below.

Surrounding area
Gyokuho-ji Temple with the 500 Rakan statues 
Tako Castle ruins
 Ashigara Station on the Odakyū Odawara Line.

See also
List of railway stations in Japan

References

External links

Izuhakone Railway home page 

Railway stations in Kanagawa Prefecture
Railway stations in Japan opened in 1923
Izuhakone Daiyuzan Line
Railway stations in Odawara